The table below lists the largest currently known prime numbers and probable primes (PRPs) as tracked by the University of Tennessee's PrimePages and Henri & Renaud Lifchitz' PRP Records. Numbers with more than 2,000,000 digits are shown.

Largest known primes
These numbers have been proved prime by computer with a primality test for their form, for example the Lucas–Lehmer primality test for Mersenne numbers.

Largest known probable primes (PRPs) 
These are probable primes. Primality has not been proven because it is too hard for general numbers of this size but they are expected to be primes.

See also 
 Largest known prime number

References

External links
 Chris Caldwell, The Largest Known Primes Database at The PrimePages
 The 5000 largest known primes at The PrimePages
 The 10,000 largest known probable primes at primenumbers.net
 PrimeGrid’s 321 Prime Search, about the discovery of 3×26090515−1

Prime numbers
Large integers